Paik Un-gyu (born 2 March 1964) is a South Korean professor of energy engineering at Hanyang University previously served as President Moon Jae-in's first Minister of Trade, Industry and Energy.

Before entering public service in 2017, he worked as a technology advisor to two major semiconductor companies in South Korea, Samsung SDI and SK Hynix. 

After joining Hanyang University's faculty in 1999, he has taken multiple leadership roles in his alma mater such as dean of energy engineering department and 3rd engineering college and advisory roles in government institutions such as then-Ministry of Science, ICT and Future Planning, Presidential Advisory Council on Science and Technology and now-Korea Institute of Energy Technology Evaluation and Planning.

He is also a member of editorial board of Scientific Reports's chemistry section and ISRN Ceramics. 

He holds three degrees - a bachelor's in inorganic materials engineering from Hanyang University, a master in material science and engineering from Virginia Tech and a doctorate in ceramic engineering from Clemson University.

References 

Living people
1964 births
Government ministers of South Korea
Trade ministers
Industry ministers
Energy ministers
South Korean engineers
Hanyang University alumni
Virginia Tech alumni
Clemson University alumni
Academic staff of Hanyang University
People from Changwon